Chaniporn Batriya (born 12 August 1999) is a Thai professional racing cyclist, who currently rides for UCI Women's Continental Team .

References

External links
 

1999 births
Living people
Chaniporn Batriya
Place of birth missing (living people)
Cyclists at the 2018 Asian Games
Chaniporn Batriya
Chaniporn Batriya